Grace Rainey Rogers (June 28, 1867–May 9, 1943) she was an American art patron, art collector, and arts philanthropist. She had donated significant amounts of money to the Cleveland Museum of Art, the Metropolitan Museum of Art, and the Museum of Modern Art; and as a result she is the namesake of many buildings in the United States. Rogers was the daughter of industrialist businessman, William J. Rainey (1836–1900), and Eleanor B. (née Mitchell) Rainey (1842–1905).

References 

1867 births
1943 deaths
American art collectors
Women art collectors
American philanthropists
People from Cleveland
People from Greenwich, Connecticut
20th-century American philanthropists